The Yungaburra National Park is a national park on the Atherton Tableland in Far North Queensland, Australia.

References

National parks of Far North Queensland
Protected areas established in 1953